Robby Gerhardt (born 10 April 1987 in Großröhrsdorf) is a German rower.

References

1987 births
Living people
German male rowers
World Rowing Championships medalists for Germany
21st-century German people